The 2006 FIA GT Mugello 500 km was the seventh race for the 2006 FIA GT Championship season.  It took place on September 17, 2006.

Official results

Class winners in bold.  Cars failing to complete 70% of winner's distance marked as Not Classified (NC).

Statistics
 Pole Position – #1 Vitaphone Racing Team – 1:48.436
 Average Speed – 149.74 km/h

External links
 Official Results

M
FIA GT Mugello